The R727 road is a regional road in Ireland, located in County Carlow, running between the R726 in Straboe and the R747 at Hacketstown.

References

Regional roads in the Republic of Ireland
Roads in County Carlow